Mayday is a Taiwanese band that released their first album in 1999 with five members, Monster (leader, lead guitar), Ashin (vocal), Stone (rhythm guitar), Masa (bass) and Ming (drums).

Formerly called So Band, they came to be known as Mayday in 1997, with the name originating from Masa's online nickname. Dubbed as “the Beatles of the Chinese-speaking world”, Mayday has won many awards in their career, including the Golden Melody Award for Best Band, an award given by the Taiwanese Ministry of Culture, in 2001, 2004, 2009 and 2012.

Members

Monster
Real name: Wen Shang Yi
Alias: Eugene Wen
Date of birth: 28 November 1976
Place of birth: Hsin-Chu, Taiwan
Position: Leader 
Instruments: Lead and rhythm guitar, backing vocals

Ashin
Real name:  Chen Hsin Hong()
Date of birth: 6 December 1975
Place of birth: Taipei, Taiwan
Instruments: Lead vocalist, Rhythm guitar, Drums

Stone
Real name: Shi Chin-hang
Date of birth: 11 December 1975
Place of birth: Taipei, Taiwan
Instruments: Rhythm and lead guitar, backing vocals

Masa
Real name: Tsai Shen-yen
Date of birth: 25 April 1977
Place of birth: Kaohsiung, Taiwan
Instruments: Bass guitar, Piano, Backing vocals

Ming
Real name: Liu Guan-you [Old Name: Liu Yen-ming]
Date of birth: 28 July 1973
Place of birth: Miaoli, Taiwan
Instruments: Drums, Backing vocals

Career

1995-1997: Formation 
Mayday evolved from So Band which was formed by Ashin, Monster and the first drummer Chien You-ta in 1995 while they were studying in The Affiliated Senior High School of National Taiwan Normal University. They were later joined by Masa and Stone, who were attending the same school. After graduation, the members went to different universities but continued to perform in pubs and eateries. They were also actively involved in promoting the growing rock music trend in Taiwan. In 1997, the band registered to perform at the Formoz Festival under the moniker Mayday. Mayday was greatly influenced by The Beatles, believing that rock had the power to change the world, and spread ideals of love and peace through their songs.

1997-1999: Mayday’s First Album 
Shortly after participating in the Formoz Festival on 29 March 1997, the band began to actively send demo tapes to various record companies in the hope of sealing a record deal. Their demo impressed Rock Records executive Jonathan Lee who described them as "the ones who would usher in the sound of the future".

As a result, they signed their first record deal with Rock Records in 1998. In the same year, they also took part in the release of the Taiwan Independent Compilation Album by indie music label TCM which included their first studio recording Motor Rock. In June 1998, they also released Embrace compilation album for which they took on most of the songwriting, production and recording duties.

In 1999, after their third drummer Robert from Loh Tsui Kweh Commune had left (the second drummer was Chen Yung-chang ), Ming joined the band and completed Mayday. They went on to release their first full-length studio album titled Mayday's First Album under Rock Records on 7 July 1999. Their debut received critical acclaim, and they gained a following in Taiwan. It went on to sell more than 300,000 copies, a considerable feat for a new band in the then pessimistic and saturated music industry. The songs  Peter and Mary  as well as  Embrace  became very popular among young audiences. Not long after, on 28 August 1999, Mayday held their first large-scale concert  168th Concert  at the Taipei Municipal Stadium. They were also nominated for the 11th Golden Melody Awards under the category of Best Musical Group.

1999-2001: Viva Love and People Life, Ocean Wild 
The band's second album Viva Love was released on 7 July 2000. Sales of Viva Love exceeded their previous album, selling more than 350,000 copies. Additionally, Viva Love won them the "Best Band" award at the 12th Golden Melody Awards. This made them the first winner of the “Best Band” award which was only introduced that year. Between 12 and 26 August 2000, Mayday held three concerts of their Stand Out tour in Taipei City, Changhua County and Kaohsiung City in Taiwan.

In 2001, Mayday worked for the first time on a movie soundtrack and accompanying score for the movie Migratory Bird which starred Rene Liu and Huang Pin Yuan. Two months later, Mayday released their third album People Life Ocean Wild, sales of which hit more than 350,000 copies after just a month. From 18 August to 1 September 2001, Mayday held their first ticketed tour Where are you going （你要去哪裡）in Taipei City, Kaohsiung City and Changhua County in Taiwan, as well as in Singapore. As members Ashin, Monster and Masa would be enlisting in the army soon after, Stone would be going to England to learn studio techniques, and Guan-You would be heading to Los Angeles to hone his drumming skills, this was a farewell tour for the band. During their concert in Kaoshiung City, guitarist Stone successfully proposed to his girlfriend on stage.

2003-2005: Return to the music scene, Time Machine and God’s Children are all Dancing
During their hiatus, Mayday released the autobiographical documentary titled The Wings of Dream as well as an accompanying movie soundtrack, with ticket sales hitting more than NT1.2 million in barely three days. On 16 August 2003, Mayday held their Castle in the Sky concert at the Taipei Municipal Stadium, attracting over 40,000 fans. This officially marked their return to the music scene.

On 11 November 2003, the band released their 4th studio album Time Machine. Sales of the album hit more than 150,000 within two days. The album won them their 2nd Golden Melody Award for Best Band.

In 2004, Mayday produced their third movie soundtrack, this time for the movie Love of May （五月之戀）. Stone also acted in the movie. On 5 November 2004, Mayday released their fifth studio album God’s Children are all Dancing （神的孩子都在跳舞）, and were nominated for Best Band at the 16th Golden Melody Awards in 2005. The band embarked on their first-ever world tour Final Home from 25 December 2004 to 1 May 2005, holding a total of 14 concerts in Taiwan, USA, China, Singapore, Malaysia, Japan and Hong Kong. They then released their first compilation in August 2005, which included 7 new songs. On 11 November 2005, Mayday staged a concert on the 91st floor of the famous world highest building, the 101 Plaza, breaking the Guinness World Records for highest concert in the world.

2006-2008: Jump! The World world tour 
In 2006, Mayday left Rock Records to set up their own record label, B’in Music. On 29 December 2006, they released their sixth studio album Born to Love（為愛而生）, and held 12 concerts in the first quarter of 2007. They kicked off their world tour Jump! The World （離開地球表面）in Hong Kong, holding 23 concerts in the span of two years.

2008-2010: Poetry of the Day After and DNA world tour 
On 23 October 2008, Mayday released their seventh studio album, Poetry of the Day After（後青春期的詩）, with preorder sales exceeding 50,000 within a short time. After the album’s release, the band even held 100 concerts in Taiwan’s schools. Nominations for the 20th Golden Melody Awards were announced on 15 May 2009, which included You are Not Truly Happy for Best Song, Ashin for Best Lyricist for the songs The Yet Unbroken Part of My Heart and Like Smoke, as well as Mayday for Best Band. The band attended the ceremony held on 27 June 2009 and returned with their third Golden Melody Award for Best Band.

On 19 March 2009, Mayday announced their DNA World Tour, holding a total of 44 concerts in 2 years. The Kaohsiung concert stop was held on 5 December 2009 at the National Stadium (Kaohsiung) with 55555 attendees, breaking the record for the concert with most attendees in Taiwan previously held by Michael Jackson.

2011: Release of 3D film 3DNA and Second Round 
From 20–23 May 2011, Mayday held four concerts of their Just Rock It!!! World Tour. On 16 September, Mayday released their 3D film, 3DNA. The film, costing 220 million to produce, was the first ever Chinese 3D concert movie. Ticket sales totalled close to NT200 million.

On 16 December 2011, Mayday released their 8th studio album, Second Round. The album was highly anticipated, with preorders totaling 129,958 in one week. As the five members of the band had different views of Doomsday, two versions of the album were released, with different covers and song sequence.

Mayday embarked on their Nowhere World Tour（諾亞方舟）on 23 December 2011, playing 7 consecutive concerts in the Taipei Arena, breaking their record of 4 consecutive concerts at the same venue in 2009.

2012: Breaking records at the Golden Melody Awards and performing at the Beijing National Stadium 
Mayday was nominated for 7 awards at the 23rd Golden Melody Awards, taking away 6 awards including Best Band, Best Mandarin Album, Best Arranger, Best Composer, Best Album Producer and Song of the Year. The album broke 300,000 sales in a year.

From then to 29 March 2014, they played a total of 82 concerts as part of their NOW-HERE world tour, including two consecutive concerts in the Beijing Bird’s Nest（北京鳥巢）in 2012 which attracted 200,000 fans, becoming the first chinese band to perform at the Beijing National Stadium.

On 3 March 2012, they held their Just Love It! I won’t let you be alone charity concert to raise funds for the underprivileged.

2013: Release of 3D film Noah’s Ark and debut in Japan 
Mayday earned another award for Best Music Video at the 24th Golden Melody Awards for the song Cheers（乾杯）in their 8th album Second Round (第二人生）. In July 2013, they held 6 charity concerts, donating a total of NT27 million to charity.

As part of their NOW-HERE world tour, they performed at the Los Angeles Memorial Sports Arena on 2 February and held 8 consecutive concerts at the Hong Kong Coliseum in May. On 17 August 2013, Mayday returned to the Beijing Bird’s Nest.

In 2013, Japanese band flumpool officially debuted in Taiwan. Ashin specially gave the band a chinese name, 凡人譜. Mayday and flumpool worked together on a Japanese theme song for the movie Oshin. This was an opportunity for Mayday to enter the Japanese music industry, as they then joined record label Amuse. On 13 November, Mayday officially released their first Japanese compilation. The band also held 2 concerts in Osaka and Tokyo at the start of 2014.

On 18 September 2013, the band released their second 3D concert film, Mayday Nowhere（5月天諾亞方舟）. It was also the world’s first 4DX concert film. Mayday worked with a German team which had been in charge of the Olympics opening ceremony and FIFA World Cup to film with high-quality equipment such as the Spidercam. Post-production of the movie was done with TWR Entertainment, a Hollywood-level team.

On 27 September 2013, Mayday officially entered Japan's music scene, appearing on Japanese music television program Music Station. On 1 and 2 October, the band was the guest for flumpool’s 5th anniversary concert at Nippon Budokan in Japan.

In the same year, Mayday also went on an interview on BBC’s show, Impact. On 30 December, the band released their 3rd compilation, The Best of 1999-2013.

2014: North American Tour, performance at Madison Square Garden 
As part of their NOW-HERE world tour, Mayday performed at the Korea International Exhibition Center in Seoul, South Korea, on 8 February 2014. On 21 February 2014, they held the first concert of their European tour at the Wembley Arena in London, attracting more than 10,000 fans from Taiwan, China, Hong Kong and Europe. They also performed in Paris at the Zénith Paris on 23 February and in the Netherlands at the Amsterdam Heineken Music Hall on 26 February. As part of their NOW-HERE North American Tour, the band held 7 concerts in Canada and the US from 17 to 29 March, in cities such as Vancouver, Toronto, Chicago, Houston, San Jose, and Los Angeles. Notably, the band performed at the Madison Square Garden in New York on 22 March, becoming the first Chinese band to perform at the venue. The final show of the NOW-HERE world tour was held in Los Angeles on 29 March.

On 27 July, Mayday started another series of Just Love It! charity concerts, with the first Just Love It! Embrace charity concert held at the Kaohsiung Arena, followed by 3 August in Beijing, 5 August in Shenzhen, and 8 August in Yilan. All proceeds were donated to charity.

On 31 December, Mayday held their Campfire concert at the Kaoshiung National Stadium, counting down to 2015 with their fans. They continued to hold three more concerts at the same venue from 1 to 3 January 2015.

2016: History of Tomorrow 
From 20 May to 1 June 2016, Mayday held 10 consecutive concerts at the Hong Kong Coliseum as part of their Just Rock It!!! World Tour, breaking the record for the most concerts held at the venue by an overseas singer.

On 17 July, Mayday returned to where they first performed after releasing their first album in 1999, Ximending in Taipei City, for a free live concert. More than 10,000 fans thronged the area to watch the concert.

On 21 July, Mayday officially released their 9th studio album, History of Tomorrow. The album sold over 200 million copies worldwide.

From 26–28 August, Mayday returned to the Beijing Bird’s Nest to perform 3 consecutive concerts for close to 300,000 fans as part of their Just Rock It!!! World Tour.

2017-2018: Life world tour and 20th anniversary of Mayday’s formation 
At the 28th Golden Melody Awards, Mayday was nominated for 7 awards, including Best Band, Best Composer, and Song of the Year. In the end, the band took away awards for Best Mandarin Album and Best Lyricist (Ashin).

On 14 February 2017, they collaborate for the first time with Alan Tam presenting song called "脱胎换骨" (Reborn) from his eighteenth Mandarin studio album Appreciation (欣賞).

Mayday’s Life world tour, the band’s 10th large-scale concert tour, kicked off on 18 March 2017 with 4 consecutive shows at the Kaohsiung National Stadium, drawing a crowd of over 200,000 fans. The Life tour is a spectacular performance with impressive production designed by world-renowned Creative Director LeRoy Bennett of Seven Design Works, who had worked with the likes of Paul McCartney, Lady Gaga, Maroon 5, Bruno Mars, and more.

On 29 March 2017, Mayday celebrated their 20th anniversary with a free outdoor concert in Taipei and a worldwide livestream of the show. Over 35,000 fans were in attendance, while millions more watched a free livestream of the concert.

The band continued their tour, with shows in cities such as Guangzhou, Xiamen and Hangzhou in China throughout April 2017. From 10 May to 23 May 2017, they held 10 consecutive sold-out shows at the Hong Kong Coliseum, rocking to over 100,000 fans. From 27 May to 14 October, Mayday continued holding shows in cities all over China, including two consecutive shows at the Beijing Bird’s Nest to over 200,000 fans, on 18 and 19 August 2017. On 28 October 2017, the band performed at Stadium Merdeka in Kuala Lumpur, Malaysia.

Mayday held their North American Tour from 8–26 November 2017, performing in 7 North American cities, including stops at Anaheim’s Honda Center and Brooklyn’s Barclays Center.

The band then returned to Asia to hold 5 consecutive concerts at Hongkou Football Stadium in Shanghai, China, from 2–8 December 2017, followed by 3 consecutive concerts at the Singapore Indoor Stadium from 15–17 December 2017. From 23 December 2017 to 7 January 2018, the band held 11 consecutive concerts at the Taoyuan International Baseball Stadium in Taoyuan, Taiwan, welcoming the new year with their fans. From 26 January to 1 February 2018, the band held 4 shows at the Cotai Arena in Macau.

The 4th leg of the Life tour brought the band to Europe, where they held two shows, one on 2 March 2018 at the AccorHotels Arena in Paris, France, and one on 4 March 2018 at the O2 Arena in London, England.

This was followed by concerts in China throughout March and April 2018. From 4 to 13 May 2018, the band performed 6 shows at Hong Kong Disneyland, which was a bigger venue to allow the fans to take in the full stage and special effects. On 19 and 20 May 2018, the band performed at the Nippon Budokan in Tokyo, Japan. The band returned to Singapore on 2 June 2018, this time performing to 40,000 fans at the Singapore National Stadium. Mayday continued to tour China, returning to the Beijing Bird’s Nest for the fifth time, this time performing 3 consecutive shows, from 24–26 August 2018. On 8 September 2018, the band performed at the Olympic Hall in Seoul, South Korea.

On 5 May 2018, they released a single named "I Will Carry You", a theme song for Android game, Honor of Kings.

Leg 6 of the tour brought Mayday to Oceania, where they performed three shows in Melbourne, Sydney and Auckland from 18 to 23 September 2018.

On 6 October 2018, the band performed in Bangkok, Thailand for the first time.

The final leg of the tour brought them back to Taiwan, as they held 10 consecutive shows at the Taichung Intercontinental Baseball Stadium in Taichung, Taiwan to round up the tour.

The Life world tour visited 55 cities and comprised a total of 122 shows. It is the largest scaled tour the band has held to date, attracting more than 4.15 million attendees. Nearly 90 shows were held in massive outdoor stadiums, and all tickets were nearly sold out, resulting in the addition of extra shows in cities including Hong Kong, Singapore, Shanghai and Beijing. The tour grossed around USD$333.33 million.

2019: Release of 3D film Life and 20th anniversary of the Blue Trilogy 
The 3D concert film Mayday LiFE was released on 24 May 2019. It comprised scenes from the 122 concerts of the Life world tour, and was the third 3D concert film by the band thus far.

To commemorate the 20th anniversary of the band’s first three albums, which fans affectionately call the Blue Trilogy, Mayday recreated and filmed new music videos for three songs in the Blue Trilogy, namely "Innocence" (純真), "World Crazy" (瘋狂世界) and "Tenderness" (溫柔), even inviting singer Stefanie Sun for a collaboration on "Tenderness".

Mayday also kicked off their "Just Rock It!!! Blue" tour with two concerts in Osaka, Japan on 6 and 7 April 2019. They then returned to the Hong Kong Disneyland to hold 6 concerts in May. From 23–25 August, Mayday held 3 consecutive shows at the Beijing Bird’s Nest, making it their sixth time performing at the famed venue. Just like previous years, Mayday returned to Taiwan to welcome the new year with their fans, performing 11 consecutive shows at the Taoyuan International Baseball Stadium in Taoyuan, Taiwan, even donating all revenue from one of the concerts to the underprivileged.

2020-present: Online concerts, Fly to 2021/2022 World Tour and 10th anniversary of Now-Here World Tour 
On 6 January 2020, Mayday announced that they would be bringing their Just Rock It!!! Blue tour to Singapore on 30 August 2020. However, in light of the COVID-19 pandemic, the concert was rescheduled twice, first to 27 February 2021 and then to 4 September 2021. It was then announced the show would be replaced with the latest tour Mayday Fly to 2022 Live in Singapore, to be held on 3 December 2022.

On 28 January 2020, the music video for "I Won’t Let You Be Lonely" passed 100 million views on Youtube, becoming the first music video by the band to reach 100 million views. On 31 May 2020, the band held the Mayday Live in the Sky, the first online concert which amassed more than 42 million views worldwide. On 18 October, the music video for "Here, After Us" passed 100 million views, making Mayday the first Chinese speaking band to have two music videos with more than 100 million views on Youtube.

On 7 November 2020, Mayday announced their Fly to 2021 concert tour, with 5 concerts at Taoyuan International Baseball Stadium from 26 December 2020 to 2 January 2021, which was postponed to 31 December 2020 to 10 January 2021 due to the pandemic; 5 concerts at Taichung Intercontinental Baseball Stadium from 17 to 22 February 2021, which was postponed to 4 to 12 December 2021 due to the pandemic; and 5 concerts at Tainan Municipal Stadium from 20 to 29 March 2021. One additional show was later added to the Taoyuan list, held on 8 January 2021. This tour was exceptionally meaningful as the band had not held a Taiwan tour since 2004. As a gesture of gratitude to COVID-19 frontline workers, the band’s company B’in Music gave out 6000 free tickets to medical staff in Taoyuan, Taichung and Tainan.

On 24 December 2020, Mayday released their first single in 971 days, "Because of You", composed and written by Ashin.

Mayday also held a second online concert, Mayday Fly to 2021, to countdown to the new year with their fans. More than 29 million fans watched the livestream at the same time.

Mayday held 4 Fly to 2022 concerts at the Kaoshiung National Stadium from 25 Dec 2021 to 1 Jan 2022, as well as their third online concert on 31 Dec 2021, continuing their yearly tradition of counting down to the new year together with their fans. The hour-long online concert features various scenic locations in Kaoshiung, with scenes shot in a helicopter, on a boat, and in the middle of a river, even employing novel XR technology. The 5 Taichung concerts were eventually held from 15 to 23 Jan 2022, after one more postponement due to venue constraints.

On 29 July 2022, the band announced their Fly to 2022 USA Tour, consisting of two shows held on 12 November 2022 and 19 November 2022 at MGM Grand Garden Arena in Las Vegas and Barclays Center in New York respectively. On 2 August 2022, they announced an encore Las Vegas show to be held on 13 November 2022.

On 17 October 2022, Mayday announced their MAYDAY NOWHERE Re: Live 2022-2023 concerts. With 8 shows held from 23 Dec 2022 to 8 January 2023 at Rakuten Taoyuan Baseball Stadium, the concerts mark the 10th anniversary of the band’s Now-Here World Tour, which visited 40 cities and was seen by nearly 2.5 million fans.

Musical style and influences
Mayday's songs are written mostly in Mandarin with some Taiwanese Hokkien tracks by Ashin, who speaks fluent Hokkien in addition to Mandarin. They are popular for their student band roots, and their ability to capture the zeitgeist of Taiwanese youth in the mid to late 1990s.

Mayday's early style of music was marked by a raw style of music production that tended towards Hokkien garage rock tunes. They were also themes of teenage angst and growing up, with several songs making oblique references to the issues.

Earlier lyrics written by Ashin often included themes such as teenage angst and growing up. In albums later on, Ashin has alluded to several cultural icons, notably the Chinese mythical monkey-god Sun Wu-Kong, Mickey Mouse, Superman, Neil Armstrong and Che Guevara. Ashin has also cited movies and novels as inspiration for his songs including "Viva Love" which was inspired by avant-garde Taiwanese director Tsai Ming Liang's 1994 movie, Vive L'Amour and the song "Armor", which was influenced by a Chinese drama and Haruki Murakami's novel Kafka on the Shore.

Mayday has expressed their admiration of the Beatles, whom they cite as influencing their ideals of rock music. The eighth track of their fifth album has a track called John Lennon where the band espouses its dreams to become the "Beatles of the Chinese World". Other musical influences include the Irish band U2, the British band Oasis, and the Japanese pop music artists Mr. Children.

Collaborations
Mayday has collaborated with many famous singers on songs. Notably, lead singer Ashin and others has written lyrics and composed songs for many singers, including Victor Wong, JJ Lin, Jolin Tsai, Fish Leong, Twins, Nicholas Tse, Jam Hsiao, S.H.E, Alan Tam, Leehom Wang, Rene Liu, Della Ding and many others. In 2019, Ashin was featured in Mandopop king Jay Chou’s surprise new single Won't Cry under his label JVR Music International. Other members of the band have also dabbled in album and song production, playing a role in many popular songs of today.

Discography

 Mayday's First Album (1999)
 Viva Love (2000)
 People Life, Ocean Wild (2001)
 Time Machine (2003)
 God's Children Are All Dancing (2004)
 Born to Love (2006)
 Poetry of the Day After (2008)
 Second Round (2011)
 History of Tomorrow (2016)

Tours 
168 Live (1999)
Stand Out Live (2000)
Where are you going Live Tour (2001)
Union Live (2003)
Final Home World Tour (2004–2006)
Jump! The World Tour (2007–2008)
D.N.A World Tour (2009–2010)
Just Rock It! World Tour (2011–2020)
Nowhere World Tour (2011–2014)
Life Tour (2017–2019)
Fly to 2021/2022/2023 Concerts (2020-2023)

Awards and nominations

Social Incidents
In 2019, the protests in Hong Kong drew global attention, including in Taiwan. In June 2019, Stone Shi Chin-hang replied to netizens' comments related to the protests on his Facebook page, and his response triggered many hostile reports to Facebook from pro-China netizens. These reports prompted Facebook to shut down the page.

References

External links

Mayday's official facebook

TaipeiMetal "News about Taiwan's Growing Metal Scene"
GigGuide Taiwan: A Directory of Live Shows and reviews of metal music in Taiwan
Encyclopaedia Metallum- The Metal Archives' directory of metal bands in Taiwan

 
Taiwanese rock music groups
Mandopop musical groups
Musical groups established in 1997
Taiwanese idols
Taiwanese Hokkien-language bands
A-Sketch artists